Nang Kwak is a Bodhisattva or household deity of Thai folklore. She is deemed to bring good fortune, prosperity, attract customers to a business, and found among merchants.

Commonly dressed in red Thai style clothing, Nang Kwak is an incarnation of Mae Po Sop, the Thai rice goddess. She is a version of the Hindu goddess Lakshmi.

Iconography
Nang Kwak is represented as a beautiful woman wearing a red dress (not always, but more often than other colors) fashioned in the Thai style. She also wears a golden crown on her head and is in the sitting or kneeling position. Her right hand is raised in the Thai way of beckoning a customer, with the palm of the hand curved and pointing downwards. Her left hand is resting on her side or holds a bag full of gold near her lap.

The present iconographic figure of Nang Kwak is an incarnation of Mae Po Sop (แม่โพสพ), the Siamese rice goddess. However, unlike Mae Po Sop, Nang Kwak does not wear the harvested rice sheaf on her right shoulder. The iconography of Nang Kwak is based in the Hindu goddess Sri Lakshmi, the goddess of wealth, fortune and prosperity.

The position of her hand in present-day iconography is similar to the Japanese Maneki Neko beckoning cat.

Symbolism
Nang Kwak is a benevolent spirit. She is deemed to bring luck, especially in the form of money, to the household. She is the patron deity of all merchants and salesmen. She can be seen in almost every business establishment in Thailand

Thai people like to have a figurine or cloth poster (called a Pha Yant, or Yantra Cloth) of this goddess in their home or shop, where it is often placed by the shrine. Some people also wear amulets with her figure around the neck, which is a logical development, due to the fact that many people in Thailand must travel around to sell their wares, which makes a portable nang Kwak amulet the obvious choice for such a person.

Legends
Although Nang Kwak is more a figure of popular folklore than a religious deity, there are Buddhist legends that seek to incorporate her into the Buddhist fold.

Brahmin trading family legend
One Buddhist legend presents Nang Kwak as Nang Supawadee (or Subhavadi) of a Brahmin trading family that converted to Buddhism. According to this legend, in the small town of Michikasandhanakara, in the Indian province of Sawadtii, there was a married family, Sujidtaprahma and his wife Sumanta, who had a daughter named Supawadee. They were merchants who sold small amounts of wares on the markets, only earning just enough to maintain their small family from day to day. One day, they were discussing their hopes and dreams for the future, and decided that they should try to expand their business to make more profit and begin to think of being able to save something for their old age.

As a result of this conversation, they decided to try to afford to buy a gwian (cart) in order to use to travel with and sell their wares to other towns and villages. They also then brought wares from the other towns to sell in Sawadtii and Michigaasandhanakara when they returned. Sometimes, Supawadee would ask to tag along for the ride, and help them. One day, as Supawadee was helping her parents to sell wares in a distant town, she was lucky to be able to hear a sermon by Phra Gumarn Gasaba Thera; she was so convinced and moved by his sermon, that she convert to Buddhism. When Gasaba Thaera saw her faith and devotion, he recollect all his powers of thought and concentration, for he was an Arahant, and bestowed blessings of good fortune and luck in salesmanship on Nang Supawadee and her family.

Ramakian epic legend
Another Thai legend presents Nang Kwak as the woman who defended a king from a demon in the epic Ramakian. She, thereafter gained the boon (merit) of fortune and prosperity wherever she was.

Nang Kwak was the daughter of Pu Chao Khao Khiao, meaning 'Grandfather Lord of the Green Mountain' (Khao Khiao). Pu Chao Khao Khiao was a Lord of the Chatu Maha Rachika realm (one of the lower levels of Heaven – an Asura realm of giants and pretas). His other name is 'Pra Panasabodee', and he is the Lord of the forest and places where wild plants grow. In that time, there was an Asura demon called To Kok Khanak (also known as 'To Anurak'). To Kok Khanak was a good friend of Pu Chao Khao Khiao, who had been attacked by Phra Ram (the hero of Ramakien, Thai version of the Hindu epic Ramayana), who had thrown a Kok tree at him which pierced his chest and carried him through space to be pinned to the side of Pra Sumen. In addition, Pra Ram cursed him with the following magic spell: 'Until your descendants weave a Civara monks robe from lotus petals, and offer it to Pra Sri Ariya Maedtrai (Maitreya the future Buddha) your curse will not be lifted.'

After this, Nang Prachant, the daughter of Lord Kok Khanag had to serve her father, spending the days and nights trying to weave a Civara robe from lotus petals, in order to have it ready for offering to Pra Sri Ariya Maedtrai who will descend to become enlightened in a future age. Meanwhile, To Kok Khanak had to remain cursed and pinned to Pra Sumen and his daughter was in a dire situation without her father to help run things. Since she had to spend all her time weaving the Civara, she had no time to sell things or make money, nor time to run a shop. When Chao Khao Khiaw heard this, he felt compassion and sent his daughter Nang Kwak to go stay with her. Because of her merit, Nang Kwak caused merchants and rich nobles to flock to Nang Prachant's home and bestow gifts of gold, silver and money on her. Nang Prachant became wealthy and led a comfortable life.

Gallery

References

Bibliography
Phya Anuman Rajadhon, Essays on Thai Folklore 
Pranee Wongthet, Reconfiguration of the Role of the Guardian Spirit: Reflection from the Phuan Feasting Ritual

External links

Brahman Origins of the Thai Mae Nang Kwak Deity
Image

Thai goddesses
Thai folklore
Folk religion
Tutelary deities
Household deities
Fortune goddesses
Commerce goddesses